The men's 100 metre breaststroke competition at the 1997 Pan Pacific Swimming Championships took place on August 11 at the NISHI Civic Pool.  The last champion was Eric Wunderlich of US.

This race consisted of two lengths of the pool, both lengths being in breaststroke.

Records
Prior to this competition, the existing world and Pan Pacific records were as follows:

Results
All times are in minutes and seconds.

Heats
The first round was held on August 11.

B Final
The B final was held on August 11.

A Final
The A final was held on August 11.

References

1997 Pan Pacific Swimming Championships